Mark Caljouw (born 25 January 1995) is a Dutch badminton player. He started playing badminton aged eight, at BC Randstad in Rijswijk.

Career  
Caljouw was selected to join the national team in 2008, and made a debut in international senior tournament in 2012. 
Caljouw competed at the 2013 European Junior Championships in Ankara, Turkey, winning a silver medal in the boys' singles event, and also a bronze medal in the mixed team event. He was selected by Badminton Europe to join the Player Development Plan "Future Stars". Caljouw won the men's singles National Championships title in 2017, beating defending champion Erik Meijs in the semi-finals and first seeded Nick Fransman in the final. He defended the title in 2018, after beating Fransman,  and also in 2019 beating Aram Mahmoud in the final and again in 2020 and 2022, each time beating youngster Joran Kweekel in the final.

He reached the semi-finals of the Dutch Open and the Scottish Open both twice in 2017 and 2018. In 2017, he also reached the semi-final of the Bitburger Open in Germany. In 2018 he won his first big title the Orléans Masters then a BWF Tour 100 event, after defending the title he won the previous year when the event was still an International Challenge event. In 2018, he also reached the final of the US Open, an BWF Tour 300 event. In 2019 he won the Austrian Open.

Achievements

European Junior Championships 
Boys' singles

BWF World Tour (1 title, 2 runners-up) 
The BWF World Tour, which was announced on 19 March 2017 and implemented in 2018, is a series of elite badminton tournaments sanctioned by the Badminton World Federation (BWF). The BWF World Tour is divided into levels of World Tour Finals, Super 1000, Super 750, Super 500, Super 300, and the BWF Tour Super 100.

Men's singles

BWF International Challenge/Series (3 titles, 1 runner-up) 
Men's singles

  BWF International Challenge tournament
  BWF International Series tournament
  BWF Future Series tournament

References

External links 
 

1995 births
Living people
People from Rijswijk
Dutch male badminton players
Badminton players at the 2019 European Games
European Games competitors for the Netherlands
Badminton players at the 2020 Summer Olympics
Olympic badminton players of the Netherlands
Sportspeople from South Holland
21st-century Dutch people